The Annie Russell Theatre is a historic theater in Winter Park, Florida, United States. The theatre was named after the English-born actress Annie Russell. It was designed by the German-born architect Richard Kiehnel of Kiehnel and Elliott and constructed in 1931. It is located on the premises of Rollins College. On July 15, 1998, it was added to the U.S. National Register of Historic Places.

History
Russell emigrated to the United States when at an early age. After a lengthy acting career in New York City, she relocated to New Jersey when she retired, however quickly changed her mind and moved to Winter Park in 1923. Shortly thereafter, she began teaching at Rollins College, continuing to do so until she died of lung disease in 1936.

The theatre is rumored to be haunted.  Visitors to the theatre have claimed to have seen a female apparition in the second story changing room.  However, due to recent structural modifications, this room can no longer be accessed.|

References

External links
 Orange County listings at National Register of Historic Places
 Annie Russell Theatre at Florida's Office of Cultural and Historical Programs
 Winter Park Historical Trail (Archived 2009-10-25) at Historic Hiking Trails (Archived 2009-10-25)
 Annie Russell Theatre at Rollins College Department of Theatre & Dance
 Notable Architects in St. Petersburg - Richard Kiehnel at City of St. Petersburg

National Register of Historic Places in Orange County, Florida
Theatres on the National Register of Historic Places in Florida
Rollins College
Buildings and structures in Winter Park, Florida
Tourist attractions in Orange County, Florida
Theatres completed in 1931
Kiehnel and Elliott buildings